Extreme Pinball is a 1995 pinball video game published by Electronic Arts for DOS and PlayStation. It was the first game developed by Digital Extremes, though founder James Schmalz had also previously created Solar Winds, Silverball and Epic Pinball in 1993. It was released via PlayStation Network in 2010.

All the music tracks for this game were made by Robert A. Allen.

Reception

Extreme Pinball received generally negative reviews. Reviewing the PlayStation version, Rich Leadbetter of Maximum commented that "the tables on offer in Extreme Pinball are just too dull. Take a look at the latest pinball tables and you see very flashy, licensed affairs with lashings of special effects and sampled sounds... all of which you won't find in Extreme Pinball." He also criticized the prominent borders in the PAL conversion. A brief review in GamePro stated "Neither as fast nor as polished as Last Gladiators for the Saturn, Extreme Pinball is strangely reminiscent of Ruiner Pinball for the Jaguar or the old Time Cruise for the TurboGrafx-16. Not a lot of 32-bit technology went into this standard game, and not a lot of fun comes out of it."

References

External links

Extreme Pinball review at Computer and Video Games
Extreme Pinball can be played for free in the browser on the Internet Archive

1995 video games
Electronic Arts games
Epic Games games
High Score Productions games
Multiplayer and single-player video games
Pinball video games
PlayStation (console) games
PlayStation Network games
Video games developed in Canada
Video games scored by Alexander Brandon